Marion C. Martinez (born January 24, 1954) is a Chicana visual artist who repurposes discarded computer hardware in the production of her artwork.

Biography 
Martinez was born in Española, North of Santa Fe, New Mexico and was raised in Los Luceros. While a college student, she lived near and worked at the Los Alamos National Laboratory. That experience inspires her work.  As a trained psychotherapist, she worked closely with Hispanic and Native American families.

Art 
Martinez began creating art with technology discards in the 1980s after experimenting with video art. Martinez's artwork portray traditional Latino cultural iconography. Much of her art, portray the Virgin de Guadalupe because of her deep connection to her.

Martinez works in series or collections based on iconography. One series or collection presents the Virgen of Guadalupe icon. A second series or collection present the Sacred Heart or Milagros, which are icons typically used for healing. A third series or collection, Martinez titles, AzTechna. Icons in this series, present Martinez's interpretation of cultural legends and myth combined with contemporary technological materials.

References

External links 
• Martinez’s Website

1954 births
Living people
20th-century American women artists
21st-century American women artists
Artists from New Mexico
People from Española, New Mexico